Leland I, sometimes stylized as Leland 1 or Leland #1, is an outdoor 1975 sculpture by Lee Kelly and Bonnie Bronson, installed in Portland, Oregon, United States.

Description and history

Leland I was designed by Lee Kelly and Bonnie Bronson, and marked one of the former's first large scale public artworks. In addition, Ron Travers from the architectural firm Travers-Johnston served as architect and Robert Gardner from  the McArthur/Gardner Partnership served as landscape architect. Pioneer Enamel was the contractor and David Cotter was an assistant. The welded Cor-Ten steel and vitrified porcelain sculpture was completed during 1973–1975 and installed in the American Plaza Towers courtyard (called American Plaza), at the intersection of Southwest 2nd Avenue and Lincoln Street, in 1975, having been commissioned and funded by the Portland Development Commission.

The abstract, geometric sculpture is constructed from three square and rectangular forms. Overall, the installation measures approximately  x  x  and weighs . Its pieces measure  x  x  (east),  x  x  (middle), and  x  x  (west), respectively. The installation features lighting also designed by the artists. Leland I was surveyed and considered "treatment needed" by the Smithsonian's "Save Outdoor Sculpture!" program in January 1994. In 2010, it was restored to address structural issues and saved from deaccession. Funding for the conservation efforts was provided by the National Endowment for the Arts, the Regional Arts & Culture Council, residents of the American Plaza Towers, and Kelly patrons.

Reception
According to the Regional Arts & Culture Council, which administers the work, the sculpture is considered a "seminal" piece in the City of Portland's public art collection. It has been called "temple-like" by art ltd. magazine and "striking" by the Oregon Arts Commission.

See also

 1975 in art

References

1975 establishments in Oregon
1975 sculptures
Abstract sculptures in Oregon
Collaborative projects
Outdoor sculptures in Portland, Oregon
Porcelain sculptures
Sculptures by Lee Kelly
Southwest Portland, Oregon
Steel sculptures in Oregon